Hương Hoàng Thi (born c.1934) is a Vietnamese former sports shooter. She competed in the 50 metre pistol event at the 1972 Summer Olympics and placed 56th. She was married to a fellow Olympics shooter Vũ Văn Danh.

References

External links
 

Year of birth uncertain
Living people
Vietnamese female sport shooters
Olympic shooters of Vietnam
Shooters at the 1972 Summer Olympics
Place of birth missing (living people)
Year of birth missing (living people)